CLAS–Cajastur was a Spanish professional cycling team that existed from 1988 to 1993. Tony Rominger won the general classification of the 1992 and 1993 editions of the Vuelta a España with the team.

References

External links

Cycling teams based in Spain
Defunct cycling teams based in Spain
1988 establishments in Spain
1993 disestablishments in Spain
Cycling teams established in 1988
Cycling teams disestablished in 1993